John Strejan was a children's pop-up book artist and paper engineer.

Biography 
Strejan was born in Detroit, Michigan on March 7, 1933, and died in Los Angeles, California on 26 March 2003.

He grew up in Portland, Oregon, and attended Portland State University. He began his career in the city as an illustrator and designer in advertising, moving to Los Angeles in 1958. As well as working for advertising agencies, he was art director for Teen magazine and Bullock's department store.
In 1965 he began working on the design of pop-up books for Elgin Davis at Graphics International. He went on to participate in the creation of more than 50 books, as a freelance author, illustrator and designer of pop-up mechanisms. He also created pop-up models of the Cinderella Castle and Getty Centre, designed posters for Toy Story, and is credited as a production designer on a short animated film, Pinocchio (1987).

Compared to earlier pop-ups, Strejan's work was noted for a dynamic use of motion, using the unfolding of the mechanism to animate the design.

Works

References 

Pop-up book artists
1933 births
2003 deaths